Taikō Yoshio (born 30 October 1953 as Yoshio Yokoyama) is a former sumo wrestler from Aomori, Japan. He made his professional debut in November 1968, and reached the top division in May 1978. His highest rank was maegashira 2. He left the sumo world upon retirement in November 1980.

Career record

See also
Glossary of sumo terms
List of past sumo wrestlers
List of sumo tournament second division champions

References

1953 births
Living people
Japanese sumo wrestlers
Sumo people from Aomori Prefecture